Aria is the fifth studio album by British rock band Asia, released in April 1994 in the United Kingdom by Bullet Proof Records and in 1995 in the United States by Mayhem Recordings. Unlike its predecessor, which was recorded with the help of several guest musicians, Aria features a stable line-up consisting of vocalist and bassist John Payne, keyboard player Geoff Downes, guitarist Al Pitrelli and drummer Michael Sturgis.

Track listing

Personnel

Asia
 Geoff Downes – keyboards; producer
 John Payne – lead vocals, backing vocals, bass, guitar; producer
 Al Pitrelli – guitars
 Michael Sturgis – drums

Technical personnel
 Andy Reilly – engineer, mixing engineer (at Les Ballons Du Chien Studios, Oxfordshire)
 Gary Stevenson – mixing engineer
 Roger Dean – cover design, painting, logotypes
 Brian Burrows – sleeve layout/typography
 Paul Rider – photography

Charts

References

Asia (band) albums
1994 albums
Albums produced by Geoff Downes
Albums produced by John Payne (singer)
Albums with cover art by Roger Dean (artist)